Calling My Children Home is a compilation album by the progressive bluegrass band Country Gentlemen, recorded and released in 1995.

Track listing

 Come and Sit by the River (Roehrig) 3:34
 Meet Me Over on the Other Side (Stalls) 2:09
 The Likes of You (Randall Hylton) 2:06
 Darby's Castle (Kris Kristofferson) 2:49
 Sit Down Young Stranger (Lightfoot) 3:15
 It's Just Like Heaven (Traditional) 2:04
 For the First Time (Eddy) 3:17
 South Elm Street (Allred) 2:13
 Blue Ridge Mountains Turning Green (Bascom Lamar Lunsford) 3:10
 The Lonely Dancer (Coulter) 2:35
 Riverboat Fantasy (Dowell) 2:09
 God's Coloring Book (Dolly Parton) 3:00
 River Bottom (Wheeler) 3:06
 Coal, Black Gold (Simons) 2:15
 The "In" Crowd (Lehner, McBee) 2:57
 Electricity (Murphy) 2:19
 I'm Lonesome Without You (Stanley) 2:24
 Loving Her Was Easier (Kris Kristofferson) 3:20
 Things in Life (Don Stover) 3:23
 Honey Don't (Perkins) 1:50

Personnel
 Charlie Waller - guitar, vocals
 Rick Allred - mandolin, vocals
 James Bailey - banjo, vocals
 Bill Yates - bass, vocals

with
 Doyle Lawson - mandolin, violin, guitar, vocals
 Mike Auldridge - Dobro
 Ronnie Bucke - drums
 Kent Dowell - banjo, guitar, vocals
 Spider Gillam - bass
 Ed Ferris - bass, vocals

References

The Country Gentlemen compilation albums
1995 compilation albums
Rebel Records compilation albums
Sugar Hill Records compilation albums